Sara Sankey née Sara Halsall (born 29 September 1967) is a retired English badminton player.

Badminton career
In 1990, Sankey represented England when she attended the Commonwealth Games where she won gold medals in the mixed team event and with Fiona Smith in the women's doubles event. She also won a silver medal with Miles Johnson in the mixed doubles. She went on to win a gold medal at the 1998 Commonwealth Games in the women's team event and a bronze medal at the 2002 Commonwealth Games with Anthony Clark in the mixed doubles event.

Sankey represented Great Britain at the 1992 Olympics in the Women's Doubles event with Gillian Gowers.

She retired from playing badminton internationally in 2002 and began coaching with All Stars Elite Badminton Club.

References

1967 births
Living people
English female badminton players
Badminton players at the 1992 Summer Olympics
Olympic badminton players of Great Britain
Badminton players at the 1990 Commonwealth Games
Badminton players at the 1998 Commonwealth Games
Badminton players at the 2002 Commonwealth Games
Commonwealth Games gold medallists for England
Commonwealth Games silver medallists for England
Commonwealth Games bronze medallists for England
Commonwealth Games medallists in badminton
Medallists at the 1990 Commonwealth Games
Medallists at the 1998 Commonwealth Games
Medallists at the 2002 Commonwealth Games